Yüzyüzeyken Konuşuruz is a Turkish independent alternative rock band founded in May 2011 in Ankara, Turkey by Engin Sevik and S. Kaan Boşnak.

On April 7, 2019, they performed their biggest 5000-person concert at Bostancı Show Center. They published the preparation stages of this concert as a documentary. Their singles, Kazılı Kuyum, published on January 10, 2020, recorded at Red Bull Music Studios in New York. The records of Kazılı Kuyum, recorded as an amateur, were released on January 24.

Discography

Albums 

 Evdekilere Selam (2013)
 Otoban Sıcağı (2014)
 Akustik Travma (2018)

Singles 

 Kaş (Otoban Sıcağı/2014)
 Dağ Serinleşir (2016)
 Ne Farkeder (2017)
 Canavar (2017)
 Sandal (2017)
 Boş Gemiler (2018)
 Ölsem Yeridir (2019)
 Kazılı Kuyum (2020)
 Sen Varsın Diye (2021)
 Son Seslenişim (2021)
 Gençliğimi Geri Ver (2022)
 Kaş II (2022)
 Durmaz Akar (2023)

Awards and nominations

References 

Musical groups from Ankara
Turkish alternative rock groups
Turkish musicians